Katherine Gonzalez (born July 30, 1962), also known as Monique Gabrielle, is an American model and actress. Gabrielle was selected as the Penthouse Pet of the Month for December 1982, and has appeared in a variety of mainstream and adult films over her career.

Early life
Gabrielle grew up in Denver, Colorado, and attended Denver Christian High School. After graduating from high school, Gabrielle moved to California with her parents.

Career 
Gabrielle was the Penthouse Pet of the Month for December 1982, and appeared in Bachelor Party in 1984 and in Deathstalker 2 in 1987. Since then, she has had an extensive career as a B-movie actress.

Although she was in the 1986 adult film Bad Girls IV (credited as Luana Chass), she did not play an explicit part.  Gabrielle was the protagonist of Emmanuelle 5.

She  had a string of minor role appearances in television shows and mainstream films that included Dream On and Hunter, as well as Night Shift (1982), Airplane II: The Sequel (1982), Flashdance (1983), Young Lady Chatterley II (1985), Hollywood Air Force (1986) and 976-Evil II (1992). She retired from acting in 2002.

Personal life
Since 2003, Gabrielle has been married to Tony Angove.

Filmography

Film

Television

References

External links
 
 
 
 Monique's Purrfect Productions

1963 births
Living people
Actresses from Kansas City, Missouri
American film actresses
Penthouse Pets
American pornographic film actresses
Pornographic film actors from Missouri
21st-century American women